Francesco "Frankie Shots" Abbatemarco (July 4, 1899November 4, 1959) was a New York captain in the Profaci-Colombo crime family, his murder is known for starting the first Colombo mafia war which was on and off for 12 years.

Early life
Abbatemarco was born in 1899 in Red Hook, Brooklyn alongside 3 other siblings, his older brother Michael "Mike Schatz" Abbatemarco (1894–1928) was also a Brooklyn gangster and close associate of Frankie Yale. His brother would be gunned down in 1928. Abbatemarco was born to Italian immigrants from Salerno and they moved to the United States around 15 years before he was born. He grew up with the Cardello brothers, who would later join the Colombo and Bonanno crime family including future captain-turned informant Michael "Mikey Bat" Cardello. As a teenager his first job was at a local lumber yard in Brooklyn and then several years later he was employed to work at Manhattan's lower west side on a teamsters firm, he also worked as a truck driver. He married Lucy Abbatemarco in 1921 and moved in together into the Park Slope neighborhood of Brooklyn. He had a son a year after named Anthony "Tony Shots" (1922–2005), who later became the underboss of the Colombo crime family in the 1970s.

Criminal career
His first prison sentence was in October 1922, which was several months after he had his first son. He was sentenced to 2 years on a conspiracy to sell morphine charge alongside 4 other criminals and served his time at the Atlanta federal prison. Abbatemarco became a soldier in the Profaci (Colombo) crime family in 1928, shortly after Yale and his brother were murdered. He was arrested on August 27, 1931, for vagrancy however he was acquitted of all charges two weeks later. Another arrest would occur in 1932 in New Jersey on suspicion charges but was subsequently released. A year later in May 1934, he was arrested on an unknown charge and only spent several days in police custody before they released him. Abbatemarco became a high level earner for his crime family and began operating several illegal gambling operations during the 1930s, including a lucrative lottery in South Brooklyn. By the 1940s Abbatemarco was elevated to the rank of caporegime (captain) and ran a crew that specialized in racketeering and burglary. He recruited teenager Carmine Persico in the early 50s; who was the imprisoned boss of the Colombo crime family from 1973 till his death in 2019. On March 25, 1952, Abbatemarco amongst his son, Joe Gallo, his brother Lawrence Gallo and 18-year old Persico were arrested by the Special Rackets Squad of the Brooklyn District Attorney's Office for racketeering related charges and the operation was alleged to have earned them $2.5 million. Abbatemarco and his son were charged with conspiracy to operate a lottery and both pleaded guilty, however 7 of the other accused did not. He received a year in prison at Riker's Island Penitentiary.

Death
On November 4, 1959, Abbatemarco was gunned down by assassins as he left a tavern owned by his cousins, the Cardello brothers. Abbatemarco and his crew stopped paying tribute to boss Joe Profaci and it was his downfall. He claimed he was in debt although he owned two homes in New Jersey and Florida, and donated extravagantly to catholic causes. The Gallo brothers have been suspected of killing him as they were allegedly promised rackets by Profaci however he gave them to his own relatives. Abbatemarco's murder would start the first Colombo war. He is buried at the Holy Cross Cemetery in Brooklyn. His son Anthony went into hiding for 2 years and sought revenge. He assisted Profaci in killing Lawrence Gallo however he mistakenly shot a police officer and was charged with attempted murder. A month after his cousin Joseph Magnasco would be murdered. During the war Abbatemarco somewhat helped the Gallo brothers and changed sides several times in order to stay alive. The war ended after Joe Gallo was assassinated in 1971. Anthony Abbatemarco would later serve as underboss from 1973 to 1977.

References

1899 births
1959 deaths
Colombo crime family
People from Red Hook, Brooklyn
Murdered American gangsters of Italian descent
Burials at Holy Cross Cemetery, Brooklyn
Deaths by firearm in New Jersey
People from Park Slope